Sir George William Kekewich  (1 April 1841 – 5 July 1921) was a British Civil Servant and Liberal Party politician.

Family and education
He was the son of Samuel Trehawke Kekewich by his second wife Louisa Buck, and the half-brother of the judge Sir Arthur Kekewich. He attended Eton and Balliol.

Civil service career
He was an Examiner in the Education Department, 1867–71, and a Senior Examiner, 1871–90. He was Secretary to the Education Department from 1890 to 1900. During this time he gave his support to Julie Schwabe, Claude Montefiore, William Mather and others who were establishing Froebelian education. He was Secretary also of the Science and Art Department from 1899 to 1900. He was knighted (KCB) in 1895. He was Secretary of the Board of Education from 1900 to 1903.

Political career
He was the Member of Parliament (MP) for Exeter from 1906 to January 1910.

References

External links 
 
 

1841 births
1921 deaths
UK MPs 1906–1910
Liberal Party (UK) MPs for English constituencies
People educated at Eton College
Alumni of Balliol College, Oxford
Knights Commander of the Order of the Bath
Members of the Parliament of the United Kingdom for Exeter